El Baile Interior is the twelfth album by the Argentine rock band Bersuit Vergarabat. It is the second album recorded by Bersuit without the main singer and one of the founders of the band, Gustavo Cordera.

Track listing

Personnel 
Alberto Verenzuela – guitar, vocals
Oscar Humberto Righi – guitar
Carlos E. Martín – drums
Rene Isel Céspedes – bass, vocals
Daniel Suárez – vocals
Germán Sbarbatti – vocals
Juan Subirá – keyboards

References

2014 albums
Bersuit Vergarabat albums